Jenny Elisabeth Lindqvist (born July 21, 1978 in Stockholm, Sweden) is a Swedish ice hockey player. She won a silver medal at the 2006 Winter Olympics.

References

1978 births
Living people
Ice hockey players at the 2006 Winter Olympics
Medalists at the 2006 Winter Olympics
Olympic ice hockey players of Sweden
Olympic medalists in ice hockey
Olympic silver medalists for Sweden
Ice hockey people from Stockholm
Swedish women's ice hockey forwards